The FIBT World Championships 1959 took place in St. Moritz, Switzerland for the record ninth time. The Swiss city had hosted the event previously in 1931 (Four-man), 1935 (Four-man), 1937 (Four-man), 1938 (Two-man), 1939 (Two-man), 1947, 1955, and 1957.

Two man bobsleigh

Four man bobsleigh

This was the last American bobsleigh gold medal at the world championships until 2009.

Medal table

References
2-Man bobsleigh World Champions
4-Man bobsleigh World Champions

IBSF World Championships
Sport in St. Moritz
1959 in bobsleigh
International sports competitions hosted by Switzerland
Bobsleigh in Switzerland 
1959 in Swiss sport